The Gun Smugglers is a 1912 silent film romantic short produced by the Kalem Company and released by General Film Company. It starred Carlyle Blackwell and Alice Joyce.

It survives in the Library of Congress collection and a copy exists at the National Film and Television Museum London.

Cast
Carlyle Blackwell - Logan Jarrow, The Smuggler's Son
Alice Joyce - Senorita Valdez
C. Rhys Price - Steven Jarrow, The Smuggler

References

External links
The Gun Smugglers at IMDb.com

1912 films
Kalem Company films
American silent short films
American black-and-white films
American romance films
1910s romance films
1910s American films